SEAC may refer to:

 SEAC (computer), a first-generation electronic computer built in 1950
 Senior Enlisted Advisor to the Chairman, an advisor to the United States Joint Chiefs of Staff
 Senior Enlisted Advisor to the Chiefs of Staff Committee, the senior other ranks advisor of to the British Chiefs of Staff Committee
 SESAR European Airports Consortium, a participant in the reform of the fragmented European air traffic management system
 The Society for Electroanalytical Chemistry
 Society for Ethics Across the Curriculum
 South East Asia Command, a World War II Allied military command
 South East Atlantic Conference
 Southeastern Athletic Conference, an intercollegiate athletic conference of historically black colleges and universities in the United States (1929–1961)
 Student Environmental Action Coalition, a coalition of environmental groups in the United States and Canada
 Radio SEAC, see Sri Lanka Broadcasting Corporation
 South Eastern Agricultural College, later Wye College